E. James Burke (born c. 1949) is a former justice of the Wyoming Supreme Court. He served on the high court from 2005–2018. He is also served as chief justice of the court, having been elected by his fellow justices in 2014. He previously served in the state as a district court justice. He retired from the court on October 8, 2018.

References

External links

|-

1949 births
Living people
Place of birth missing (living people)
St. Joseph's College alumni
University of Wyoming College of Law alumni
Justices of the Wyoming Supreme Court
21st-century American judges
Chief Justices of the Wyoming Supreme Court